A grant is a fund given by an end entity grant – often a public body, charitable foundation, a specialised grant-making institution, or in some cases a business with a corporate social responsibility mission – to an individual or another entity, usually, a non-profit organisation, sometimes a business or a local government body, for a specific purpose linked to public benefit. Unlike loans, grants are not to be paid back.

European Union

European Union grants
The European Commission provides financing through numerous specific calls for project proposals. These may be within Framework Programmes. Although there are many 7-year programmes that are renewed that provide money for various purposes. These may be structural funds, Youth programmes and Education programmes. There are also occasional one-off grants to deal with unforeseen aspects or special projects and themes. Most of these are administered through what are called National Agencies, but some are administered directly through the Commission in Brussels. Due to the complexity of the funding mechanisms involved and especially the high competitiveness of the grant application processes (14%) professional Grant Consulting firms are gaining importance in the grant writing process. EU grants shall not be mixed with EU tenders, that can be sometimes similar.

Another funding body in Europe is the European Council. Similarly there are calls and various projects that are funded by this council.

Denmark 
Denmark has an educational universal grant system, SU (Statens Uddannelsesstøtte, the State Education Fund). It is available to all students from 18 years of age, with no upper limit, who are currently taking courses. There are two systems of SU.
 Youth Education (Ungdomsuddannelse), available to all students in pre-university education (upper secondary education).
 Higher Education (Videregående Uddannelse), available to all students in post-secondary (higher education), is a coupon grant valid for 5 years and 10 months from beginning higher education.

In addition to the government grant scheme, more than 35,000 grants in Denmark exists, which is the second largest number of foundations in Europe by country. The foundations are estimated to possess 400 billion Danish kroner (US$60 billion) in accessible funds.

Ireland 
Grant-giving organizations in Ireland include the Irish Research Council for Science, Engineering and Technology and Science Foundation Ireland for research grants.

Poland 
Major grant organisations funded and operated by the government include:
 Polish Development Fund
National Centre for Research and Development
National Science Centre
 Medical Research Agency
National Freedom Institute – Centre for Civil Society Development
State Fund for Rehabilitation of Disabled People

United Kingdom 
Grants are made available in the United Kingdom for a variety of business, charitable and research purposes. The biggest grant distributors are government departments and agencies which offer grants to third party organisations (often a charitable organisation) to carry out statutory work on their behalf.

Other major grant distributors in the United Kingdom are the National Lottery, charitable trusts and corporate foundations (through Corporate Social Responsibility policies). For example, Google contributes to the grants process through its Google Grants programme, where any charitable organization can benefit financially from free Google Ads advertising if they share Google's social responsibility outcomes.

Grants are time limited (usually between one and three years) and are offered to implement existing government policies, to pilot new ways of doing things or to secure agreed outcomes. A grant will usually only be given for a specific project or use and will not usually be given for projects that have already begun.

Over the years the discipline of writing grant bids has developed into a specialised activity. Many organisations employ fundraising professionals to carry out this work. In the United Kingdom the fundraising profession is governed by The Institute of Fundraising and is independently regulated by the Fundraising Regulator in England, Wales, and Northern Ireland and by the Scottish Fundraising Standards Panel in Scotland. The grant writing process generally includes search, proposal and accounting for competitive grant funds. Traditional search methods - for example referring to the Charities Aid Foundation Directory of Grant Making Trusts - are quickly becoming replaced by online fundraising tools.

In 2016, the UK Government introduced proposals to include an "anti-lobbying clause" in grant-funding agreements, i.e. payments which "support lobbying or activity intended to influence or attempt to influence Parliament, Government or political parties, or attempting to influence the awarding or renewal of contracts and grants, or attempting to influence legislative or regulatory action"  would not be treated as eligible for grant funding and therefore funded organisations would need to fund these activities in some other way. The Scottish Government indicated it would not be introducing similar measures.

Top grant-making charities
As of 2021, 6 out of the top 10 charities in England and Wales (as measured by expenditure on charitable activities) make grants to individuals and/or organisations.

 British Council makes grants to individuals and organisations.
 Wellcome Trust makes grants to individuals and organisations.
 Save the Children International makes grants to organisations.
 Arts Council England makes grants to individuals and organisations.
 Charities Aid Foundation makes grants to organisations.
 Cancer Research UK makes grants to individuals and organisations.

United States

In the United States, grants most often come from a wide range of government departments or an even wider range of public and private trusts and foundations. According to the Foundation Center these trusts and foundations number in excess of 88,000 and disperse in excess of $40 billion every year. Trusts and Foundations are a little more complex to research and can be found through subscription-based directories.

Most often, education grants are issued by the government to students attending post-secondary education institutions. In certain cases, a part of a government loan is issued as a grant, particularly pertaining to promising students seeking financial support for continuing their educations.

Grant compliance and reporting requirements vary depending upon the type of grant and funding agency. In the case of research grants involving human or animal subjects, additional involvement with the Institutional Review Boards (IRB) and/or Institutional Animal Care and Use Committee (IACUC) is required.

 National Aeronautics and Space Administration (NASA) : NASA receives and evaluates both solicited and unsolicited grant proposals. The NASA Shared Services Center (NSSC) currently awards all new grants for NASA HQ, GSFC, NMO, Stennis and Dyrden. Awards are made in accordance with the NASA Grants and Cooperative Agreement Handbook
 National Institutes of Health (NIH)
 The Center for Scientific Review (CSR) is the focal point at NIH for the conduct of initial peer review of grant and fellowship applications. It implements ways to conduct referral and review.
 The Office of Extramural Research (OER) provides guidance to institutes in research and training programs conducted through extramural (grant, contract, cooperative agreement) programs.
 National Science Foundation (NSF)
 Most NSF grants go to individuals or small groups of investigators who carry out research at their home campuses. Other grants provide funding for mid-scale research centers, instruments and facilities that serve researchers from many institutions. Still others fund national-scale facilities that are shared by the research community as a whole.
 The NSF receives about 40,000 proposals each year, and funds about 10,000 of them. Those funded are typically the projects that are ranked highest in a merit review process. These reviews are carried out by panels of independent scientists, engineers and educators who are experts in the relevant fields of study, and who are selected by the NSF with particular attention to avoiding conflicts of interest. (For example, the reviewers cannot work at the NSF itself, nor for the institution that employs the proposing researchers.) All proposal evaluations are confidential (the proposing researchers may see them, but they do not see the names of the reviewers).

Grant effectiveness

Econometric evidence show public grants for firms can create additionality in jobs, sales, value added, innovation and capital. For example, this was shown to be the case for large public R&D grants, as well as for public grants for small and medium-sized firms or tourism firms.

See also
 Concession (contract)
 Funding
 Land grant
 Student financial aid
 Subsidized loan
 Subsidy

References

External links
Search: Grants United States Government Grant Resource
 European Commission European Union Contracts and Grants

Philanthropy